Moreira ( or ) is primarily a Portuguese-language surname. Notable people with the name include:

Given name
Moreira Chonguiça, Mozambican jazz saxophonist

Surname

Arts and entertainment
 Airto Moreira (born 1941), Brazilian musician
 Antonio Moreira (1897–?), Portuguese poet
 Moraes Moreira (1947–2020), Brazilian musician and singer
 Moreira da Silva (1902–2000), Brazilian singer and songwriter
 Rafael Moreira (born 1974), Brazilian musician

Journalism
 Paul Moreira (born 1961), a Portuguese-French investigative journalist and television documentary filmmaker.

Politics
 Adriano Moreira (1922–2022), Portuguese politician
 Afonso Augusto Moreira Pena, Brazilian politician
 Delfim Moreira (1868–1920), Brazilian politician
 Eurídice Moreira (1939–2020), Brazilian politician
 Fabrizio Moreira (born 1982), Ecuadorian politician
 Humberto Moreira Valdés, Mexican politician 
 Leonardo Fernandes Moreira (1974–2020), Brazilian politician
 Moreira Franco (born 1944), Brazilian politician

Sports

Football
 Abel Fernando Moreira Ferreira (born 1981), Brazilian football manager and former player
 Ademar Moreira Marques (born 1981), Portuguese former football midfielder
 Adriano Moreira (footballer) (born 1983), Portuguese former football goalkeeper
 Ahmad Mendes Moreira (born 1995), Dutch football winger
 Alfredo Moreira (born 1938), Portuguese former football defender
 Almami Moreira (born 1978), Guinea-Bissauan former football midfielder
 Álvaro Adrián Núñez Moreira (born 1973), Uruguayan-Spanish former football goalkeeper
 André Luiz Moreira (born 1974), Brazilian former football attacking midfielder
 André Moreira (born 1995), Portuguese football goalkeeper
 Andre Moreira Neles (1978–2020), Brazilian-Equatoginean football striker and gospel singer
 Argenis Moreira (born 1987), Ecuadorian football defender
 Artur Moreira (born 1984), Portuguese football player
 Augusto César Moreira (born 1992), Brazilian football player
 Aymoré Moreira (1912–1998), Brazilian football goalkeeper and coach
 Ben-Hur Moreira Peres (born 1977), Brazilian former football player
 Benvindo António Moreira (born 1989), football player
 Bruno (footballer, born 1989) (born 1989), Brazilian football player
 Bruno Miguel Moreira de Sousa (born 1982), Portuguese football central defender
 Bruno Moreira (born 1987), Portuguese football forward
 Cândido Alves Moreira da Costa (born 1981), Portuguese former football right back
 Carlos Gabriel Moreira de Oliveira (born 1999), Brazilian football left-back
 Cassiano Dias Moreira (born 1989), Brazilian football forward
 Clayton de Sousa Moreira (born 1988), Luxembourgian football right back
 Clésio Moreira dos Santos (born 1958), Brazilian football referee
 Dalton Moreira Neto (born 1990), Brazilian football defender
 Daniel Jesus Moreira Carvalho (born 1995), Portuguese football goalkeeper
 Daniel Moreira (born 1977), French former football striker
 Danilo Moreira Serrano (born 1980), Brazilian football player
 David Luiz Moreira Marinho (born 1987), Brazilian football player
 Diego Eli Moreira (born 1988), Brazilian-born Hong Kong football player
 Dodi (footballer) (born 1996), Douglas Moreira Fagundes, Brazilian football midfielder
 Douglas Felipe Moreira Cobo (born 1987), Brazilian football player
 Edinho (footballer, born 1994) (born 1994), Brazilian football midfielder
 Edmilson Jesus Moreira Mendes (born 1997), Cape Verdean football defender
 Eduardo Moreira Fernandes (born 1977), Capeverdean football midfielder
 Edu (footballer, born 1974) (born 1974), Eduardo Araújo Moreira, Brazilian former football midfielder
 Elías Moreira (born ?), Brazilian football player
 Enderson Moreira (born 1971), Brazilian football manager
 Fabio Daniel Moreira Barros (born 1987), Portuguese football player
 Fábio Emanuel Moreira Silva (born 1985), Cape Verdean football midfielder
 Fabio Moreira (born 1972), Brazilian former football player
 Fábio Ruben Moreira Tavares ((born 26 March 1988), Portuguese football forward
 Facundo Moreira (born 1989), Uruguayan football midfielder
 Felipe Moreira (born 1981), Brazilian former football midfielder and manager
 Felipe Moreira Santos (born 1988), Brazilian football player
 Francisco Moreira (1915–1991), Portuguese football midfielder
 Francisco Moreira da Silva Rebelo (born 1947), Portuguese former football right back
 Geraldo Moreira da Silva Júnior (born 1974), Brazilian football attacking midfielder
 Gleison Wilson da Silva Moreira (born 1995), Brazilian football player
 Guilherme Rodrigues Moreira (born 1987), Brazilian football player
 Héctor Moreira (born 1987), Guatemalan international football defender
 Hilton Moreira (born 1981), Brazilian football striker
 Hugo Moreira (footballer, born 1982) (born 1982), Portuguese former football winger
 Hugo Moreira (footballer, born 1990) (born 1990), Portuguese football defender
 Igor Araújo (footballer) (born 1987), Portuguese football goalkeeper
 Jaime Moreira Pacheco (born 1958), Portuguese football manager, and former football central midfielder
 Jansen José Moreira (1927–2010), Brazilian football player
 Jean (footballer, born 1986), Brazilian football defensive midfielder
 Jefferson Moreira Nascimento (born 1988), Brazilian football player 
 João Mendes (footballer, born 1988) (born 1988), Portuguese football forward
 João Moreira (footballer, born 1970) (born 1970), Portuguese former football player
 João Moreira (footballer, born 1986) (born 1986), Portuguese football forward
 João Moreira (footballer, born 1988) (born 1988), Portuguese football forward
 João Moreira (footballer, born 1998) (born 1998), Portuguese football defender
 João Moreira (footballer, born 2004), (born 2004), Brazilian-born Portuguese football player
 João Paulo (footballer, born 1992) (born 1992), Portuguese football player
 Joaquín Piquerez Moreira (born 1998), Uruguayan football midfielder
 Jonathan Luiz Moreira Rosa Júnior (born 1999), Brazilian football forward
 Jonathan Moreira (born 1986), Brazilian football right back
 Jonathan Moreira (footballer, born 1996) (born 1996), Argentine football midfielder
 Jorge Carlos Santos Moreira Baptista (born 1977), Portuguese former football goalkeeper
 Jorge Javier Moreira Pereira (born 1998), Venezuelan football midfielder
 Jorge Moreira (born 1990), Paraguayan football right back
 José Gerardo Moreira Rocha Júnior (born 1977), Brazilian football player
 José Manuel Moreiras (1976–2019), Argentine football player
 José Moreira (born 1982), Portuguese former football goalkeeper
 José Semedo (footballer, born 1985) (born 1985), Portuguese football defensive midfielder
 José Varela (footballer) (born 1997), Cape Verdean football winger
 Josimar Moreira (born 1988), Brazilian football player
 Júlio César Mendes Moreira (born 1983), Brazilian former football player
 Julio Cesar Moreira Ribeiro (born 1995), Brazilian football striker
 Juninho (footballer, born 5 April 1985) (born 1985), Brazilian football forward
 Leonardo Moreira (born 1986), Japanese football player
 Leonardo Moreira Morais (born 1991), Brazilian football right back
 Leonel Moreira (born ) national football goalkeeper
 Ligger Moreira Malaquias (born ), Brazilian football player
 Ligia Moreira (born 1992), Ecuadorian football defender
 Luis Andrés Moreira (born 1996), Ecuadorian football player
 Luis Moreira (born 1978), Ecuadorian football midfielder
 Luíz Carlos Martins Moreira (born 1985), Brazilian football defensive midfielder
 Márcio Gama Moreira (born 1984), Brazilian football left-back
 Marco Aurélio (footballer, born 1952) (born 1952), Brazilian former football manager
 Mariela Moreira (born 1983), Bolivian football centre back
 Moreira E Silva Alison Pierre (born 1988), Brazilian football player
 Natanael (footballer, born 2002) (born 2002), Brazilian football player
 Nuno Silva (footballer, born 1986) (born 1986), Portuguese football player
 Osmar Francisco Moreira Jesuino (born 1987), Brazilian football forward
 Ozu Moreira (born 1986), Brazilian-born Japanese beach football defender
 Paulo Sérgio (footballer, born 1984) (born 1984), Portuguese football player
 Paulo Sérgio Moreira Gonçalves (born 1984), Portuguese football player
 Pavão (footballer, born 1974) (born 1974), former football right back
 Pedrinho (footballer, born 1992) (born 1992), Portuguese football player
 Pedro Bispo Moreira Júnior (born 1987), Brazilian striker
 Pedro Ken Morimoto Moreira (born 1987), Brazilian football player
 Pedro Manuel Taborda Moreira (born 1978), Portuguese former football goalkeeper
 Pedro Moreira (Cape Verdean footballer)
 Pedro Moreira (footballer, born 1983) (born 1983), Portuguese former football right back
 Pedro Moreira (footballer, born 1989) (born 1989), Portuguese football midfielder
 Pedro Silva (footballer, born 1997) (born 1997), Portuguese football goalkeeper
 Rafael Moreira (footballer) (born 1990), Brazilian football player
 Ramón Osni Moreira Lage (born 1988), Brazilian football attacking midfielder
 Raul Moreira (born 1934), former Portuguese football player
 Renato Adriano Jacó Moreira (born 1984), Brazilian football player
 Ricardo Costa (footballer, born 1981) (born 1981), Portuguese former football player
 Ricardo Moreira (born 1983), Argentine football player
 Roberto de Assis Moreira (born 1971), former football player
 Roberto Moreira (born 1987), Paraguayan football forward
 Rodrigo Moreira (footballer, born 1996) (born 1996), Argentine football defender
 Rodrigo Moreira (footballer, born 2001) (born 2001), Uruguayan football forward
 Ronaldinho (born 1980), Brazilian football player
 Rui Moreira (footballer) (born 1996), Portuguese football midfielder
 Sávio Moreira de Oliveira (born 2004), Brazilian football forward
 Steven Moreira (born 1994), French football right back
 Thiago Luiz Moreira de Araújo (born 1988), Brazilian football player
 Tiago César Moreira Pereira (born 1975), Portuguese former football player
 Tiago Moreira (born 1988), Portuguese football right back
 Valdeir Celso Moreira (born 1967), Brazilian former football player
 Vatinei César Moreira dos Santos (born 1979), Brazilian football player.
 Víctor Moreira (born 1982), Andorran international football midfielder
 Vinícius Moreira de Lima (born 1996), Brazilian football attacking midfielder
 Vítor Hugo Fernandes Moreira (born 1982), Portuguese football goalkeeper
 Wagner da Silva Moreira (born 1988), Brazilian football full back
 Walisson Moreira Farias Maia (born 1991), Brazilian football central defender.
 Weverson (footballer, born 2000) (born 2000), Brazilian football left-back
 Yago Moreira Silva (born 1994), Brazilian football winger
 Yefferson Moreira (born 1991), Uruguayan football player
 Zezé Moreira (1917–1998), Brazilian football player

Other sports
 Fatima Moreira de Melo (born 1978), Dutch field hockey player
 Federico Moreira (born 1961), Uruguayan cyclist
 José Moreira (swimmer) (born 1962), Brazilian swimmer
 Juraci Moreira (born 1979), Brazilian triathlete
 Pablo Moreira (born 1970), Argentine field hockey player
 Paulão Moreira (born 1969), Brazilian beach volleyball player

Crime
 Erismar Rodrigues Moreira (died 2005), Brazilian gang leader
 Juan Moreira (died 1874), Argentine gaucho outlaw and folk-hero

See also
 João Moreira (disambiguation)
 Pedro Moreira (disambiguation)

Portuguese-language surnames